Norma Argentina (born 1948 in San Luis) is an Argentine actress. She works prominently in the cinema of Argentina.

Filmography
 Cama Adentro (2004) aka Live-In Maid
 El buen destino (2005)
 Tupac, el grito (2005)
 Martín Fierro, el ave solitaria (2006)
 City of Your Final Destination (2007)
 The Effect of Love (2007)
 The Cat Vanishes (2011)

Awards
 Argentine Film Critics Association Awards: Silver Condor; Best New Actress; for Cama adentro; 2006.

References

External links
 

1948 births
Living people
People from San Luis, Argentina
Argentine film actresses